Mikhail Audzeyeu (born 2 February 1982) is a Belarusian weightlifter. He competed in the men's heavyweight event at the 2004 Summer Olympics.

References

1982 births
Living people
Belarusian male weightlifters
Olympic weightlifters of Belarus
Weightlifters at the 2004 Summer Olympics
Place of birth missing (living people)